Kevin Hensley may refer to:

 Kevin Hensley (swimmer), swimmer from the United States Virgin Islands
 Kevin Hensley (politician), member of the Delaware House of Representatives
 Kevin Hensley (soccer) (born 1992), American Paralympic soccer player